Shahr-e Babak County (also romanized as Shahr-e Bābak, Šahr-e Bābak; translation from Persian: "City of Bābak") is in Kerman province, Iran. The capital of the county is the city of Shahr-e Babak. At the 2006 census, the county's population was 100,192 in 22,973 households. The following census in 2011 counted 90,495 people in 24,551 households. At the 2016 census, the county's population was 103,975 in 31,483 households.

Administrative divisions

The population history and structural changes of Shahr-e Babak County's administrative divisions over three consecutive censuses are shown in the following table. The latest census shows two districts, nine rural districts, and five cities.

References

 

Counties of Kerman Province